Staatl. Fachingen (full name: Staatlich Fachingen) is a German medicinal and mineral water discovered in 1740, first sold in jars in 1746, and later bottled starting in 1870. Due to its relatively high content of hydrogen carbonate, it can neutralize excessive acid in the stomach. The spring is located in Lahn valley north of Wiesbaden, close to the eastern boundary of Nassau natural preserve.

The company is headquartered in Fachingen/Lahn and has been part of Mineralbrunnen Überkingen-Teinach AG since 1990. Staatlich indicates that the spring was state-owned until this 1990 sale (previous owner: Rhineland-Palatinate). In 2001, Karlsberg acquired controlling interest in the Mineralbrunnen Überkingen-Teinach company from Nestlé, including Afri-Cola and the mineral water brands Staatlich Fachingen and Hirschquelle.

Since 2008, Staatl. Fachingen has also been selling flavored water products. German market share of the company was about 28% in 2004.

Notable Appearances 
Fachinger Mineral Water was consumed by Adolf Hitler during his term as Chancellor.

References

External links
fachingen.de

Bottled water brands
Carbonated water
German brands